Lia Beel Quintana (born 22 July 1995 in Pinjarra, Australia) is a blind Spanish Paralympic athlete who competes in sprinting events in international level events. She trains with her husband David Alonso Gutierrez who is her running guide.

References

1995 births
Living people
Sportspeople from Toledo, Spain
Paralympic athletes of Spain
Spanish female sprinters
Athletes (track and field) at the 2016 Summer Paralympics